Kiros Alemayehu(1948–1994) was an Ethiopian singer. He was born in Tigray region, Saesi Tsaedaemba and was the only child to his parents.

Biography

Early life
Kiros was born to his father Girazmach Alemayehu Meles and Mrs. Qeleb Gebremeskel in the eastern part of Tigray region, in a village known as Saesi Tsaedaemba in July 26 1948 (August 19 1940 EC). He went to school in the nearby city of Wukro and then joined Atse Yohannes High School in Mekelle.

Professional career
Kiros was a prolific songwriter and singer. He popularized Tigrigna songs through his albums to the non-Tigrinya speaking Ethiopians.  Before joining Ras Theatre in 1975E.C (circa 1982-1983) where he published his first album, Kiros had worked as assistant trainer of Tigray Musical Troupe (ትግራይ ኪነት). Some of his songs include "Anguay fisis", "Fililiy","Selam Hawa", "Suwur Fikri" "Adey Mekele". Kiros is well known for his songs that highlighted the ups and downs of everyday human life including songs that reflected the social and political atmospheres of his time. Many admire Kiros for his unique writing style and poetic abilities making him one of the best artists of his day. His music remains impactful till this day as his songs are made popular through steaming services such as Spotify  and Apple. Kiros along with other musicians had played in Libya and other middle eastern countries.
A memorial library is under construction in Wukro near his birthplace.

Death and funeral

Kiros died from intestinal complications in October 13 1994.

See also
Music of Ethiopia

References

Further reading
 Kiros Alemayehu Biography Video

1994 deaths
1948 births
People from Tigray Region
Krar players
20th-century Ethiopian male singers